RRR may refer to:

Art and entertainment
 RRR (film), an Indian Telugu language film
 RRR (soundtrack), soundtrack album of the film of the same name
 RRRecords, a record label
 Roots Rock Riot, a 2007 album by Skindred
 Rhythm, Rhyme, Results, an educational music company based in Cambridge, Massachusetts, United States
 River Runs Red, the debut album from Brooklyn, New York band Life of Agony, released in 1993

Medical
 Relative risk reduction, a statistical term used in biostatistics and epidemiology

Places
 Reed Research Reactor, a research nuclear reactor used by Reed College

Roads 

 Regional Ring Road, a proposed ring road around Hyderabad, India

Sport
 Red River Rivalry, the Oklahoma-Texas college football rivalry game
 Required run rate, a scoring statistic in limited-overs cricket
 Double R Racing, formerly Räikkönen Robertson Racing, a Formula 3 racing team

Technology
 ROCKETSROCKETSROCKETS, a video game for Mac, Linux and Windows
 RRR Computers, Inc., a defunct American computer company based in Massachusetts
 3RRR, a community radio station, based in Melbourne, Australia
 Ridge Racer Revolution, a racing game developed by Namco
 Residual resistance ratio, a method to detect the amount of impurities in metal

Other
 Rubicon Research Repository
 Required rate of return, a value indicating the minimum return that investors expect from an investment
 Required reserve ratio, or reserve ratio requirement, a regulation that sets the minimum reserves each bank must hold to customer deposits and note
 Ridiculously Resilient Ridge, a weather occurrence
 The three Rs, reading, 'riting and 'rithmetic, a basic education term
 Rotors running refueling, a method of hot refuelling helicopters
 Rayman Raving Rabbids, a Ubisoft game

See also
 3R (disambiguation)
 3RR (disambiguation)
 RRRR (disambiguation)
 RR (disambiguation)
 R (disambiguation)
 RRRrrrr!!!